The  are a Japanese women's softball team based in Amagasaki, Hyogo. The Rainbow Stokes compete in the Japan Diamond Softball League (JD.League) as a member of the league's West Division.

History
The Rainbow Stokes were founded in 1949, as Shionogi softball team.

The Japan Diamond Softball League (JD.League) was founded in 2022, and the Rainbow Stokes became part of the new league as a member of the West Division.

Roster

References

External links
 
 Shionogi Rainbow Stokes Hyogo - JD.League
 

Japan Diamond Softball League
Women's softball teams in Japan
Sports teams in Hyōgo Prefecture